The 2000 Tennis Masters Cup and the ATP Tour World Championships (also known as the Gold Flake ATP Tour World Doubles Championship for sponsorship reasons) were tennis tournaments played on indoor hard courts for the singles event, and outdoor hard courts for the doubles event. It was the 31st edition of the year-end singles championships, the 27th edition of the year-end doubles championships, and both were part of the 2000 ATP Tour. The singles event took place at the Pavilhão Atlântico in Lisbon, Portugal, from 28 November through 3 December 2000, and the doubles event at the KSLTA Tennis Center in Bangalore, India, from 13 December through 26 December 2000.

Champions

Singles

 Gustavo Kuerten defeated  Andre Agassi 6–4, 6–4, 6–4
 It was Kuerten's 5th title of the year, and his 10th overall. It was his only career year-end championships title.

Doubles

 Donald Johnson /  Piet Norval defeated  Mahesh Bhupathi /  Leander Paes 7–6(10–8), 6–3, 6–4

External links
Official website
Singles Draw
Doubles Draw

Tennis Masters Cup

2000
Tennis tournaments in Portugal
Tennis tournaments in India
2000 in Portuguese tennis
2000 in Indian tennis
Sports competitions in Lisbon
Sports competitions in Bangalore
2000s in Bangalore
2000s in Lisbon
November 2000 sports events in Europe
December 2000 sports events in Europe
November 2000 sports events in Asia
December 2000 sports events in Asia